The "French Fury" was a failed attempt by Francis, Duke of Anjou, to conquer the city of Antwerp by surprise on 17 January 1583.

Background
During the Eighty Years' War the States-General had asked in 1581 the Duke to become head of state of the Seventeen Provinces, to obtain French support in expelling the Spanish troops.

Anjou did not have much influence in the Netherlands, and attempted to seize more power. He decided to try to occupy Antwerp, the largest city of the Seventeen Provinces, by surprise. Antwerp had already been comprehensively sacked by Spanish troops in the "Spanish Fury" of 1576.

Unfortunately for Anjou his plan was discovered. The inhabitants, still traumatised by the Spanish plunder seven years earlier, were determined to prevent another occupation by foreign troops by all means possible.

Attempted coup
On 17 January 1583, in a ploy to deceive the citizens of Antwerp, Anjou asked to be permitted to enter the city in order to honour them with a Royal Entry. As soon as his troopers entered the city, the city gates were slammed shut behind them. Having lost the advantage of surprise, the small French army found itself hopelessly trapped within the city as it was bombarded from windows and rooftops with stones, rocks, logs, and even heavy chains. The city's experienced garrison then opened up with deadly, point-blank fire on the troops. Only a few Frenchmen, including the Duke of Anjou, escaped. Over 1,500 troops perished, many of them hacked to death by the enraged citizens of Antwerp. One contemporary account is by Jean Bodin, an adviser to Anjou who likewise escaped the slaughter.

Aftermath
The position of Anjou after this attack became untenable and he left the country in June 1583. His departure also discredited William the Silent, who had always supported Anjou.

The city was eventually conquered by the Spanish under Alexander Farnese, Duke of Parma after the Siege of Antwerp (1584-1585).

References
 George Edmundson, "The 'French Fury' at Antwerp (1583)", in Cambridge Modern History, edited by A. W. Ward, G. W. Prothero and Stanley Leathes, vol. 3 (Cambridge, 1907), p. 256.
 Louis Prosper Gachard, ed., "Lettre de Jean Bodin sur l'entreprise du duc d'Anjou contre la ville d'Anvers", Compte rendu des séances de la Commission Royale d'histoire ou recueil de ses bulletins, 2nd series, 12 (1859), pp. 458–463.

Battles of the Eighty Years' War
Battles involving the Spanish Netherlands
16th century in Antwerp
Conflicts in 1583
Battles involving France
1583 in the Habsburg Netherlands
Eighty Years' War (1566–1609)